FVR refers to Fidel Valdez Ramos (1928–2022), the 12th President of the Philippines (1992–1998).

FVR may also refer to:
 Feline viral rhinotracheitis
 Finavera Wind Energy, a Canadian energy company
 Finn Valley Railway, in Ireland
 Free voluntary reading
 Fur language
 FV Ravensburg, a German football club
 Rhineland Football Association
 Venezuelan Rugby Federation